Clarence J. Roberts (October 21, 1873 – January 27, 1931) was a justice of the New Mexico Supreme Court from January 10, 1912 until his retirement on January 21, 1921.

Born in Jefferson County, Indiana, in 1892 Roberts began reading law in the Madison, Indiana office of attorney Perry E. Bear. Roberts gained admission to the bar in Indiana in 1894, at the relatively young age of 21, and in 1899 was elected county attorney of Jefferson County. Roberts remained in that office until 1905, then moved to Colfax County, New Mexico, in 1907, and was elected as a Republican to the New Mexico House of Representatives in 1909. He was appointed to the New Mexico Territorial Supreme Court by President William Howard Taft in 1910, and then elected to the court following New Mexico's admission to statehood, taking office as chief justice in January 1912. After serving in that capacity for five years, Roberts was reelected to an eight-year term as an associate justice on the court in 1917, but resigned in 1921 to return to private practice. He then pursued various business ventures, obtaining substantial real estate holdings in the state.

Roberts died following a bout of indigestion following a period of several years of declining health.

References

1873 births
1931 deaths
People from Jefferson County, Indiana
U.S. state supreme court judges admitted to the practice of law by reading law
Republican Party members of the New Mexico House of Representatives
Justices of the New Mexico Supreme Court